Chatel or Châtel may refer to:

Places 
In France:
 Châtel, Haute-Savoie, in the Haute-Savoie department
 Châtel-Censoir, in the Yonne department
 Chatel-Chéhéry, in the Ardennes department
 Châtel-de-Joux, in the Jura department
 Châtel-de-Neuvre, in the Allier department
 Châtel-Gérard, in the Yonne department
 Châtel-Guyon, in the Puy-de-Dôme department
 Châtel-Montagne, in the Allier department
 Châtel-Moron, in the Saône-et-Loire department
 Châtel-Saint-Germain, in the Moselle department
 Châtel-sur-Moselle, in the Vosges department
 Le Châtel, in the Savoie department

In Switzerland:
 Châtel-Saint-Denis, in the canton of Fribourg
 Châtel-sur-Montsalvens, in the canton of Fribourg

People with the surname 
 Béatrice Chatel French physicist
 Claudine Chatel (born 1951), French-Canadian actress and author
 Jean Châtel, would-be assassin of King Henry IV of France
 Luc Chatel, French politician

See also 
 Chantel
 Chastel (disambiguation)
 Chattel, or personal property

French-language surnames